The ZEC de l'Anse-Saint-Jean is a "zone d'exploitation contrôlée" (controlled harvesting area) (ZEC) of , located in the municipality of L'Anse-Saint-Jean in Le Fjord-du-Saguenay Regional County Municipality, in the administrative region Saguenay-Lac-Saint-Jean, Quebec, Canada. The main economic activities of the area are forestry and tourist activities.

The Zec de la Rivière-Saint-Jean-du-Saguenay is managing segments of Saint-Jean River (Saguenay). While "Zec de l'Anse-Saint-Jean" administers public lands, mainly forested land surrounding the river.

Geography 
The ZEC is adjacent on north side to the Zec du Lac-au-Sable.
 three rivers, one of which is exploited for fishing, and
 100 lakes, of which 35 are used for fishing.

The brook trout is very populous in the various water bodies in Zec.

Almost all lakes are accessible by car or bike. Some lakes are equipped with docks and boats available for rent. The hikers can follow the scenic trails and take in the sights like Mount Laure-Gaudreault and Crésimont lake.

Major lakes of Zec are: "De la loutre" (Otter), Wipi, Du Treuil (Du Winch), Moreau, Malfait, De la Muraille (On Wall), Aimable (Lovable), Des Conscrits (The Conscripts), Fourche (Pitchfork) and Du Chantier. Annually, the surface of water bodies is generally frozen from November to April.

Toponymy 
The names of the two controlled harvesting zone (zec) are related to the place name of the river, town and bay.

The name "Zec Anse-Saint-Jean" was recorded on August 5, 1982 at the Bank of place names in the Commission de toponymie du Québec (Geographical Names Board of Québec).

See also 

 L'Anse-Saint-Jean, a municipality
 Saguenay River
 Le Fjord-du-Saguenay Regional County Municipality
 Saguenay-Lac-Saint-Jean
 Parc national du Fjord-du-Saguenay
 Zone d'exploitation contrôlée (controlled harvesting zone) (ZEC)

References

External links 
 
 

Protected areas of Saguenay–Lac-Saint-Jean
Protected areas established in 1978